The 1992 Japanese motorcycle Grand Prix was the first round of the 1992 Grand Prix motorcycle racing season. It took place on the weekend of 27–29 March 1992 at the Suzuka Circuit.

500 cc race report
Wet race. Wayne Rainey had to ride with an injured hand from a pre-season test (part of his pinky was removed).

John Kocinski was on pole, and took the lead at the start from Doug Chandler and Mick Doohan. Rainey had a bad start.

Àlex Crivillé crashed out of his debut 500cc race; Wayne Gardner crashes out, as did Rainey at the Dunlop Corner.

Chandler took the lead of a 4-man group with Schwantz, Doohan and Kocinski. Kocinski crashed out.

Doohan and Chandler dropped Schwantz. Gardner had remounted and gotten to 5th before crashing out for good a second time and breaking his leg in two places.

500 cc classification

References

Japanese motorcycle Grand Prix
Japanese
Motorcycle